Teodor Wålemark (born 25 June 2001) is a Swedish professional footballer who plays as a centre-back for Norrby IF.

Club career

Early career & BK Häcken
Wålemark spent his first months of life in Cyprus, where his father played professional football for AEL Limassol. They returned to Ljungskile in 2004, where Wålemark began playing football at the age of 5-6 at Ljungskile SK. When he was ten years old, the family moved to Gothenburg and football life continued in Västra Frölunda IF. As a 15-year-old, he was moved up to the A-team and after a half a season in the Swedish fourth division, where he also got his debut, he wanted to try new challenges. After a trial with BK Häcken's U19 team, which at this time was trained by Teddy Olausson, he impressed so much that despite his young age, he was promised a place in the U19 team's starting eleven. Wålemark played more or less all games for the team.

At the end of May 2019 the club confirmed, that Wålemark would be promoted to the first team squad in summer 2019, signing a professional contract until the end of 2021. However, he was never given the chance on the first team, before he left the club at the end of the season.

Ljungskile SK
On 28 November 2019, Ljungskile SK confirmed, that 18-year-old Wålemark had returned to his former childhood club on a deal until the end of 2021. Except for the first game, Wålemark played as a starter in the next 10 games in a row. In the beginning of 2021, Wålemark stated in public, that he wanted to leave the club. He officially left the club a few days later.

Lindome GIF
On 16 February 2021, Wålemark signed with Lindome GIF. He got his debut on 3 April 2021 against FC Trollhättan.

Norrby IF
On 20 December 2022 it was confirmed, that Wålemark had signed a two-year deal with Ettan Fotboll side Norrby IF.

Personal life
Teodor is the son of former Swedish footballer and current coach Jörgen Wålemark. Teodor was born in Cyprus, where his father played at the time. His uncle, Bo Wålemark, is also a football coach, while his cousin, Patrik Wålemark, also is a footballer.

References

External links

Teodor Wålemark at SvFF

Living people
2001 births
Association football defenders
Swedish footballers
Sweden youth international footballers
Superettan players
Ykkönen players
Västra Frölunda IF players
BK Häcken players
Ljungskile SK players
Norrby IF players